Tonja is an English and Slovene feminine given name that is considered to be a short form of Antonija. Notable people with that name include the following:

 Tonja Buford-Bailey (born 1970), American hurdles athlete
 Tonja Christensen (born 1971), American model, actress and Playboy Playmate
 Tonja Walker (born 1960), American actress and singer

See also

Tanja (disambiguation)
Tinja (disambiguation)
Tona (name)
Tonda (name)
Tonga (name)
Tonia (name)
Tonka (name)
Tonna (disambiguation)
Tonra (surname)
Tonya (given name)

Notes

English feminine given names
Slovene feminine given names